Wayne Fyvie (born 28 March 1972) is a South African former rugby union player.

Playing career
Fyvie made his test match debut for the Springboks against , during the 1996 tour of South Africa, at Loftus Versfeld in Pretoria. He played a further two test matches during the 1996 and also played in five tour matches, scoring two tries for the Sprinboks.

Test history

See also
List of South Africa national rugby union players – Springbok no. 638

References

1972 births
Living people
South African rugby union players
South Africa international rugby union players
Sharks (Currie Cup) players
Sharks (rugby union) players
Alumni of Hilton College (South Africa)
Rugby union players from the Free State (province)
Rugby union flankers